The women's K-2 500 metres event was a pairs kayaking event conducted as part of the Canoeing at the 1992 Summer Olympics program.

Medalists

Results

Heats
18 crews entered in three heats. These rounds were used for seeding in the semifinals.

Semifinals
The top four finishers in each semifinal and the fastest fifth-place finisher advanced to the final.

Final
The final was held on August 7.

References
1992 Summer Olympics official report Volume 5. pp. 147–8. 
Sports-reference.com 1992 women's K-2 500 m results.
Wallechinsky, David and Jaime Loucky (2008). "Canoeing: Women's Kayak Pairs 500 Meters". In The Complete Book of the Olympics: 2008 Edition. London: Aurum Press Limited. p. 493.

Women's K-2 500
Olympic
Women's events at the 1992 Summer Olympics